Szyszyn-Pole  is a settlement in the administrative district of Gmina Ślesin, within Konin County, Greater Poland Voivodeship, in west-central Poland.

The settlement has a population of 67.

References

Szyszyn-Pole